Sagra  is a genus of beetles belonging to the family Chrysomelidae, commonly referred to as frog-legged beetles or kangaroo beetles.

List of subgenera and species
Subgenus Prosagra Crowson, 1946
 Sagra carbunculus Hope, 1842
 Sagra fulgida Weber, 1801
 Sagra humeralis Jacoby, 1904
 Sagra jansoni Baly, 1860
 Sagra mouhoti Baly, 1862
 Sagra odontopus Gistl, 1831

Subgenus Sagra Fabricius, 1792
 Sagra femorata (Drury, 1773)
 Sagra longicollis Lacordaire, 1845

Subgenus Tinosagra Weise, 1905
 Sagra tristis Fabricius, 1798
 Sagra buqueti Lesson, 1831
 Sagra formosa
 Sagra papuana Jacoby, 1889
 Sagra purpurea Lichtenstein, 1795
 Sagra rugulipennis Weise
 Sagra speciosa

References
 Zipcodezoo
 Biolib

Chrysomelidae